Kaloudis Lemonis (born 11 November 1995) is a Greek professional footballer who plays as a defensive midfielder for Super League 2 club Chania.

References

1995 births
Living people
Greek footballers
Greek expatriate footballers
Super League Greece players
Football League (Greece) players
Gamma Ethniki players
Aris Thessaloniki F.C. players
SC Telstar players
Doxa Drama F.C. players
O.F. Ierapetra F.C. players
Association football midfielders
Footballers from Moudania